Blueberry Mountain is a mountain located in western Maine. Named because of the abundant blueberries on its summit and upper slopes, it is a popular day hike. The summit area is partially open and has good views over Evans Notch and toward North and South Baldface in New Hampshire. It is ascended by the White Cairn, Stone House, and Blueberry Ridge trails. It is considered a spur of Speckled Mountain.

References

Mountains of Oxford County, Maine
Mountains of Maine